Thomas N. Morahan (29 June 1906 – 1969) was a British film designer nominated for an Oscar for the film Sons and Lovers (1960).

Born Thomas Hugo Morahan, he was the son of sculptor and carver Michael Joseph Morahan (1877–1939). His own son was director and producer Christopher Morahan (1929–2017).

Selected filmography

Art director
 Dreaming Lips (1937)

Production Designer

 So Evil My Love (1948)
 Mr. Perrin and Mr. Traill (1948)
 Treasure Island (1950)
 Decameron Nights (1953)
 The Love Lottery (1954)
 The Long Haul (1957)
 Another Time, Another Place (1958)
 Sons and Lovers (1960)
 Satan Never Sleeps (1962)
 The Third Secret (1964)
 Those Magnificent Men in their Flying Machines (1965)

References

External links

History of Thomas's Morahan family

1906 births
1969 deaths
British art directors
British film designers